Teldenia sparsata is a moth in the family Drepanidae. It was described by Wilkinson in 1967. It is found in New Guinea.

References

Moths described in 1967
Drepaninae